Fgura United Football Club, commonly known as Fgura United is a Maltese football club based in Fgura, Malta. The Club currently plays in the Maltese First Division.

Fgura United was founded on June 1, 1971, and is the oldest sport organisation in the locality of Fgura, Malta.

History

Early years (1971–1974)
Fgura United was founded on June 1, 1971, and is the oldest sport organisation in the locality of Fgura, Malta. The first president was Mr. Zaren Vella, with Mr. C Farrugia as the secretary and Mr. E Muscat as the treasurer. During the club's early years, the premises changed twice from St Thomas Street in 1973, then to Triq L-Isponsun and then back to St Thomas Street in new premises that the club has invested in. Between the 1971–72 and 1973–74 seasons the club participated in the MFA Amateur League and the MFA Minor League.

Domestic Competition(1975–2011)
Fgura United entered the National League in 1974–75 season when the club participated in the MFA 4th Division. Fgura United has been participating in all MFA tournaments including the National, Reserves, Under 21 and Under 19 competitions continuously ever since. Since 1995, Fgura United has run a youth nursery which aims to train young footballers aged 6–16 to develop their talents and enable them to participate in Maltese youth competitions including the Under 12, Under 15 & Under 17.

New Era (2012–present)
In 2012 the club finally has suitable training facilities and a club house. The project included the football ground and a five-a-side pitch – both with artificial turf and a club house including a hall, offices for administration, a bar and five dressing rooms which were funded mainly through the UEFA Hat-Trick Programme, the Malta Football Association, Kunsill Malti għall-iSport, the Good Causes Fund and the club itself who thanks to the sound administration throughout the years was able to inject the funds obtained for the sale of property into the new complex which was built over the past months. opened their new artificial turf ground to replace the old one. Michel Platini was present at the opening of the pitch. The pitch is now Fgura's training ground. In Season 2013–14 Fgura United achieved the biggest success in club's history by winning promotion to Maltese First Division. Another milestone was made during the following season which they were a debut team in the first division and manage to make 15 games unbeaten which secure their status in the first division which was the main target for the club. In their debut season in Maltese First Division team has done more than expected by winning high 5th place at the end of the season.

Club facilities
In 2012 the club finally got suitable training facilities and a club house. The project included the football ground and a five-a-side pitch – both with artificial turf and a club house including a hall, offices for administration, a bar and five dressing rooms. The facilities were inaugurated by UEFA president Michel Platini. Thanks to the quality of this facility, except of senior team, the complex is also used by Fgura United youth teams, but also by some of the most prominent football clubs in Malta. For the future is planned construction of another five-a-side pitch, tennis courts, gym, apartments for the players and a small park which will be within this complex as well.

League and cup history

Honours and achievements

Domestic

 Maltese Second Division
 Promotion (1) 2013–2014
 Maltese Third Division
 Promotion (2) 1987–1988, 2011–2012

Kit manufacturers and shirt sponsors

Current squad

Coaching staff

Club Officials

References

External links
Fgura United official site

Football clubs in Malta
Association football clubs established in 1971
1971 establishments in Malta
Fgura